Robert Currier (born November 29, 1949) is a Canadian former professional ice hockey player who played primarily in the American Hockey League (AHL). After completing his junior career with the Cornwall Royals, he was drafted in the first round of the 1969 NHL Amateur Draft by the Philadelphia Flyers. Currier spent four seasons playing for the Flyers top minor league affiliate in the AHL, but he did not appear in a National Hockey League game.

Career statistics

References

External links

1949 births
Canadian ice hockey centres
Canadian ice hockey right wingers
Cornwall Royals (QMJHL) players
Ice hockey people from Ontario
Living people
National Hockey League first-round draft picks
Sportspeople from Cornwall, Ontario
Philadelphia Flyers draft picks
Quebec Aces (AHL) players
Richmond Robins players
San Diego Gulls (WHL) players
Seattle Totems (WHL) players
Tulsa Oilers (1964–1984) players
Canadian expatriate ice hockey players in the United States